Norman Lawrence Cox (September 22, 1925 – April 28, 2008) was an American football quarterback who played two seasons with the Chicago Rockets of the All-America Football Conference. He was drafted by the Chicago Bears in the 31st round of the 1948 NFL Draft. He played college football at Texas Christian University and attended Grandfalls-Royalty High School in Grandfalls, Texas. Cox was also a member of the Montreal Alouettes of the Interprovincial Rugby Football Union.

References

External links
Just Sports Stats

1925 births
2008 deaths
Players of American football from Texas
American football quarterbacks
American football running backs
Canadian football running backs
American players of Canadian football
TCU Horned Frogs football players
Chicago Rockets players
Montreal Alouettes players
People from Stamford, Texas